Sukkasem na Chiengmai, Prince Uttarakan Koson (1880 – 20 March 1913), was a member of the royal family of Chiang Mai, and the first child of Kaeo Nawarat and Chamariwong.

Biography 
Sukkasem was the first child of Kaeo Nawarat and Chamariwong of Chiang Mai. He had two full siblings, Princess Buathip na Chiengmai and Wongtawan na Chiengmai, Prince Ratchabut. He attended St. Patrick's School in Moulmein, British Burma.

Biographer Prani Siridhara na Badalung wrote in his book that Sukkasem loved Ma Mya (Mamia), a young Mon lady of Burmese citizen in Moulmein, but this love was unrequited. Apart from the biography book, no further proof of this affair was found so far. Sukkasem married Princess Buachum na Chiengmai in 1905, but they had no children. Sukkasem died on 20 March 1913 at the age of 33.

References

1880 births
1913 deaths
Sukkasem na Chiengmai
Sukkasem na Chiengmai